Euzophera batangensis is a species of snout moth in the genus Euzophera. It was described by Aristide Caradja in 1939 and is known from Batang, Sichuan, China, from which its species epithet is derived.

References

Moths described in 1939
Phycitini
Moths of Asia
Taxa named by Aristide Caradja